Opeloge is a surname. Notable people with the surname include:

Avatu Opeloge (born ~2005), Samoan weightlifter
Don Opeloge (born 1999), Samoan weightlifter
Ele Opeloge (born 1985), Samoan weightlifter
Jack Opeloge, Samoan weightlifter
Mary Opeloge (born 1992), Samoan weightlifter
Niusila Opeloge (born 1980), Samoan weightlifter
Petunu Opeloge (born 1994), Samoan weightlifter
Tovia Opeloge (born 1990), Samoan weightlifter